Shamir Daniel Sanchez Fenelon (born 3 August 1994) is an Irish footballer who plays as a winger or striker for Horsham.

Career

Brighton and Hove Albion
Fenelon began his career with Brighton & Hove Albion and after scoring 20 goals for the club's youth team in the 2011–12 season he signed a professional contract in May 2012.

In May 2013, Fenelon was then given a one-year contract with the club. While on loan at Torquay United, Fenelon signed a further contract extension with the Albion until 2015.

Fenelon made his Brighton & Hove Albion debut in the opening game of the 2014–2015 season, in a 1–0 home defeat against Sheffield Wednesday. Fenelon made only two further appearances for the club: one in the league as a substitute in an away defeat at Birmingham City and another in the first round of the League Cup. At the end of the 2014–15 season, Fenelon was released.

Loan Spells
He had a successful loan spell with Conference South side Tonbridge Angels in November 2013.

On 11 January 2014, Fenelon joined Football League Two side Torquay United on loan. He made his Football League debut on 25 January 2014 in a 1–0 defeat against Oxford United. After making two appearances, Fenelon loan spell with Brighton was extended for another one month. He scored his first goal on 15 February 2014 in a 3–1 defeat away at Chesterfield. On 11 March 2014, Fenelon extended his loan spell with the Gulls further until the end of the 2013–14 season. On 22 March 2014, Fenelon was sent-off after making contact with his elbow on the opposition's captain Michael Flynn, in a 1–0 loss against Newport County. After the match, the club appealed for Fenelon's sending off, as the club's assistant manager Lee Hodges believed that the referee's decision was wrong citing, "both players have got arms in the air flailing." However, the appeal was rejected and would have to serve his three match ban. After his return from suspension, Fenelon was unable to help the club survive relegation, as Torquay United drop down to the Football Conference, making twelve appearances and scoring once. Despite unable to help the club survive the relegation, Fenelon stated that the loan spell at Torquay United helped him progress and his maturity.

On 29 August 2014, Fenelon joined Football League One side Rochdale on a season long loan. The next day, Fenelon made his debut for the club, where he came on as a substitute for Matt Done in the second half, in a 2–0 win over Bradford City. After making four appearances for the club, it announced on 9 October 2014 that Fenelon loan spell with Rochdale ended after being recalled by his parent club.

After returning to Brighton & Hove Albion, Fenelon went out on loan again by joining Football League Two side Tranmere Rovers until January 2015. He made his Tranmere Rovers debut, the next day, as they lost 2–1 to Southend United. The next game, on 29 November 2014, Fenelon scored his first goal for the club, in a 3–1 win over Portsmouth. Fenelon returned from Tranmere on 2 February 2015.

On 27 February 2015, he was sent on loan to Football League Two side Dagenham & Redbridge in a one-month deal. He made his debut for the club the next day in a 2–1 league defeat to Mansfield Town, replacing Alex Jakubiak as a substitute. After making four appearances, Fenelon returned to his parent club.

Crawley Town
Fenelon signed for League Two side Crawley Town on 23 June 2015 on a free transfer on a one-year deal. Upon joining the club, Fenelon revealed he had offers from League Two clubs, as well from clubs of his home country before joining Crawley Town.

Fenelon joined National League South Whitehawk on a month's loan and made his debut for The Hawks as a substitute in the 2–2 draw at Ebbsfleet United on 29 August 2015.

Non-league
On 30 June 2016, Fenelon joined National League side Aldershot Town. Over three seasons, Fenelon played 102 games for the Shots, scoring 20 goals.

On 7 May 2019, Fenelon signed for National League side Maidenhead United. He left the club at the end of the season after five goals in 21 games.

Fenelon joined Billericay Town on 14 August 2020. He played twelve times, scoring one goal.

He joined Horsham in July 2021.

International career
In March 2015, Fenelon received his first call-up to the Republic of Ireland under-21 side for the 2017 UEFA European Under-21 Championship qualification match against Andorra. He made his debut in that match, replacing Conor Wilkinson in a 1–0 win.

Personal life
In July 2014, Fenelon changed his surname from Goodwin to Fenelon.

Career statistics

References

External links

1994 births
Living people
English footballers
English people of Irish descent
Republic of Ireland association footballers
Republic of Ireland under-21 international footballers
Association football forwards
Brighton & Hove Albion F.C. players
Tonbridge Angels F.C. players
Torquay United F.C. players
Rochdale A.F.C. players
Tranmere Rovers F.C. players
Dagenham & Redbridge F.C. players
Crawley Town F.C. players
Whitehawk F.C. players
Aldershot Town F.C. players
Maidenhead United F.C. players
Billericay Town F.C. players
Horsham F.C. players
English Football League players
National League (English football) players
Isthmian League players